The Palais du Roure is a listed hôtel particulier in Avignon, France.

History
It belonged to the Baroncelli family until it was purchased by author Jeanne de Flandreysy in 1918. She bequeathed the building to Avignon.

Collections
It is maintained as a museum.
The collections include memorabilia of John Stuart Mill, the British economist who died in Avignon in 1873.

Conservation
It has been listed as an official historical monument since 19 November 1941.

References

Buildings and structures in Avignon
Hôtels particuliers
Monuments historiques of Provence-Alpes-Côte d'Azur
Museums in Avignon